Italy participated in the Junior Eurovision Song Contest 2015 in Sofia, Bulgaria after winning in its first appearance in the 2014 contest. They had initially selected their act through the national final Ti lascio una canzone on 12 September 2015, were Chiara and Martina Scarpari had won. However, on 17 September 2015, it was announced that there were technical issues in the voting, and the final would be re-run on 19 September 2015. The Scarpari sisters went on to win the re-run final, and would still represent Italy at the 2015 contest. Italy finished in 16th place during the contest with 34 points.

Before Junior Eurovision

Ti lascio una canzone 
On 24 June 2015, the Italian national broadcast Radiotelevisione italiana (RAI) confirmed Italy's participation at Junior Eurovision Song Contest 2015. It was also announced that the country representative would be select through a national final, to be held during the first episode of the forthcoming edition of Ti lascio una canzone.

Final 

The final took place on 12 September 2015, hosted by Antonella Clerici under the direction of orchestra Maestro Leonardo De Amicis. The singers are all participants from past series of Ti lascio una canzone. The show was articulated in three rounds. In the first round, the participants performed in duels with one another, and the qualifiers were selected by 33% of jury vote, 33% of orchestra vote and 33% of televote. In the second round, the 6 qualifiers sang together a medley consisting of the Italian Eurovision entries "L'essenziale" (2013), "Gente di mare" (1987) and "Nel blu, dipinto di blu" (1958). The 2 superfinalists were selected by 50% jury and 50% televote. In the third round, the winner of the national final was selected by 100% televote. One of the guests during the evening was Martina Stoessel, main character of the Disney Channel TV series Violetta.

Technical issues and re-run 
On 17 September 2015, the Italian broadcaster RAI announced that the third round results were cancelled due to technical problems with the televoting. Emanuele Bertelli was announced at the start of the third round as being the superfinalist instead of Giovanni Scutera Sardo. The correction of this error was only made after the Scarpari Sisters had made an exhibition during the televoting. The repetition of the national final's third round was held on 19 September during another episode of Ti lascio una canzone. The winner was decided by televoting only, which closed shortly after both performances, which were a repetition of the performances in the third round of the final. Following a quick commercial break, the show returned to announce Chiara and Martina as the winners with 67.39% of the vote.

Artist and song information

Chiara and Martina
Born in Reggio Calabria on 22 May 2000, the sisters Chiara and Martina Scarpari showed a natural love of music since their early childhood. Chiara and Martina's singing talent was noticed first by their grandfather, who five years earlier encouraged them to follow their passion. Three years later they met their mentor, Christian Cosentino, who raised the bar even higher and encouraged them to sing and compete on an international level. After the victories in some local contests, in 2014 Chiara and Martina debuted on the Rai1 prime time talent show for teens ‘Ti lascio una canzone.’ After two winning nights, they qualified for the final night and earned third place.

The twins released their first single, ‘Sempre insieme,’ and represented Italy at the New Wave Junior contest, where they were the runners-up, missing victory by only one point. In December 2014 Chiara and Martina were invited to Moscow, where they performed with the renowned Cuban singer Roberto Kel Torres. This year, their success continued; performing again on Rai 1 and being invited back to New Wave Junior 2015 as special guests. They then won the Italian National Final for the Junior Eurovision Song Contest, and are competing with their second single ‘Viva,’ written together with the best-selling artist Gigi D’Alessio.

Viva
Viva is a song by Italian twin sisters Chiara and Martina Scarpari and it represented Italy in the Junior Eurovision Song Contest 2015 in Sofia, Bulgaria.

At Junior Eurovision
At the running order draw which took place on 15 November 2015, Italy were drawn to perform fourth on 21 November 2015, following  and preceding .

Final

The twins were dressed in coordinating red knee-length dresses and black boots. Their camera shots certainly highlighted the fact that these sisters are identical twins, but they were certainly allowed to shine on their own in solo shots. A number of sweeping pans of the arena brought a positive energy to the proceedings. At the end of the voting, Italy placed 16th (second-to-last) with 34 points.

Voting
The voting during the final consisted of 50 percent public televoting and 50 percent from a jury deliberation. The jury consisted of five music industry professionals who were citizens of the country they represent, with their names published before the contest to ensure transparency. This jury was asked to judge each contestant based on: vocal capacity; the stage performance; the song's composition and originality; and the overall impression by the act. In addition, no member of a national jury could be related in any way to any of the competing acts in such a way that they cannot vote impartially and independently. The individual rankings of each jury member were released one month after the final.

Following the release of the full split voting by the EBU after the conclusion of the competition, it was revealed that Italy had placed sixteenth (second-to-last) with the public televote and tenth with the jury vote. In the public vote, Italy scored 13 points, while with the jury vote, Italy scored 43 points. Below is a breakdown of points awarded to Italy and awarded by Italy in the final and the breakdown of the jury voting and televoting conducted during the final.

Detailed voting results
The following members comprised the Italian jury:
 Marida Caterini
 Stefania Zizzari
 Andrea Corba
 Michele Bertocchi
 Carolina Rey

Notes

References

Italy
Junior
Junior Eurovision Song Contest
Junior Eurovision Song Contest